Iris Schulze (born 16 April 1958) is a German former cross-country skier. She competed in two events at the 1976 Winter Olympics.

Cross-country skiing results

Olympic Games

References

External links
 

1958 births
Living people
People from Bautzen
People from Bezirk Dresden
German female cross-country skiers
Olympic cross-country skiers of West Germany
Cross-country skiers at the 1976 Winter Olympics
20th-century German women
Sportspeople from Saxony